Butterfly and Flowers (or Peesua lae dokmai) is a 1985 Thai drama film directed by Euthana Mukdasanit, set in Muslim-majority southern Thailand. The film was screened at the 1985 Hawaii International Film Festival, one of the earliest Thai films to gain exposure outside Thailand.

The film is adapted from a 1978 novel of the same title by Nipphan (Makut Oradee), which won the award at the Thailand National Book Fair. The book has become required reading for secondary schoolchildren in Thailand.
Regarded as one of the best Thai films ever made, Butterfly and Flower (Peesua lae Dokmai), highlights the hardships faced by a boy who works selling popsicles at the local train station and forced by economic circumstance to smuggle rice across the Thai-Malaysian border. Aside from exposing Thai audiences to regional poverty, the 1985 movie broke new ground by portraying a Buddhist-Muslim romance. Butterfly and Flower delighted the Thai public when it earned a Best Film award at the 1986 East-West Film Festival in Honolulu .

Cast
 Suriya Yaowasang as Hu Yan
 Wasana Pholyiam  as Mimpi
 Suchao Pongwilai as Hu Yan's dad
 Duangjai Hathaikarn as teacher

External links
 
Butterfly and Flowers at SiamZone 

1985 films
1985 drama films
Thai drama films
Thai-language films
Films based on Thai novels
Thai national heritage films